Andrew Ford may refer to:

Andrew Ford (composer) (born 1957), English and Australian composer, writer and radio presenter
Andrew Ford (cricketer) (born 1963), former Bahamian cricketer
Andrew Ford (courtier) (born 1957), British Army officer, Comptroller of the Lord Chamberlain's Office
Andrew Ford (swimmer) (born 1989), Canadian swimmer
Andrew Ford (water polo) (born 1995), Australian water polo player
Andrew Ford (Australian footballer) (born 1970), Australian rules footballer
Andy Ford (English footballer) (born 1954), association football manager

See also
Andrew Forde (born 1987), Canadian engineer
Andy Fordham (1962–2021), English darts player
Ford (surname)